The speckled puffer, Sphoeroides yergeri, is a species in the family Tetraodontidae, or pufferfishes. It is found in the Caribbean Sea.

References

Tetraodontidae
Fish described in 1972
Fish of the Atlantic Ocean